Wingert is a surname. Notable people with the surname include:

Chris Wingert (born 1982), American soccer player
Emmert L. Wingert (1899–1971), American jurist
Harry Shindle Wingert (1865–1928), American football coach 
Lutz Wingert (born 1958), German philosopher
Mick Wingert (born 1974), American comedian and voice actor
Norm Wingert (born 1950), American soccer player
Rebekah Wingert-Jabi, American documentary filmmaker
Wally Wingert (born 1961), American actor and voice actor

See also
Wingert House, historic farmhouse in Chicago, Illinois, United States
Wengert